Tommy Lee Goes to College is an NBC reality television show that began broadcasting on Tuesday, August 16, 2005 and on VH1 on Friday, August 19, 2005. It features Mötley Crüe drummer Tommy Lee attending the University of Nebraska and attempting to fit in. It was co-produced by Lee, totaling six episodes.

Background
The show features Lee, who is a high-school dropout, facing collegiate challenges like finding a roommate, trying out for athletic teams and marching band, trying to join a fraternity, and studying chemistry. Lee starts a fraternity called "House of Lee", with its own residential house, and its newly recruited members breaking into the art museum at night to vandalize and install their own artwork.

The show is considered a "reality show", but much of the plot is scripted. Contrary to what is shown, there were casting calls for parts in the show. It was also later revealed that the "dorm room" in which Lee stayed was in an off-campus site made to look like a college dorm room. A disclaimer at the end of the show revealed that while Lee attended classes, he did not enroll at the University of Nebraska and that certain situations were staged or edited for comedic effect.

The administration of the University of Nebraska-Lincoln decided to host the reality show to market the university for recruiting and public relations purposes.

Soundtrack
The theme song for "Tommy Lee Goes to College" is the song "Good Times", which was the second single from Lee's second solo album Tommyland: The Ride, which was released a week before the series premiered. The album is the soundtrack to the series and to Lee's book Tommyland, which was also released in 2005.

Cast
 Tommy Lee
 Matt Ellis as Tommy's Roommate. Matt never attended the campus casting call. He was cast after producers met him working at a local pub. He was a senior at the University during the time of filming and graduated later that same semester.
 Natalie Riedmann as Tommy's Tutor

External links
 University of Nebraska-Lincoln's Tommy Lee Comes to UNL website

References

2000s American reality television series
2005 American television series debuts
2005 American television series endings
NBC original programming
Television series by Universal Television
University of Nebraska System
Television shows set in Nebraska
Mötley Crüe